Arimardanna Pura (Arimardanapur) is the most famous classical name of the city of Bagan (Pagan), Myanmar. It means the "City that Tramples on Enemies."

The Burmese chronicles do not agree on the foundation facts. The 16th century chronicle Yazawin Kyaw states that it was founded in 156 CE by King Pyusawhti. The oldest chronicle Zatadawbon Yazawin says it was founded in 190 CE (Sunday, 15th waxing of Tagu 112 of Early Pyu calendar) by King Pyusawhti. However, later standard chronicles of Toungoo and Konbaung dynasties, Maha Yazawin and Hmannan Yazawin respectively, state that the city was founded in 107 CE by King Thamoddarit, a scion of Sri Ksetra Kingdom. The chronicles continue that King Thinli Kyaung I (r. 344–387) moved the palace to nearby Thiri Pyissaya.

However, evidence indicates that  the earliest human settlement in the Pagan region dates only from the mid-7th century CE. Therefore, Zata's foundation date is probably based on the Burmese calendar, and the foundation date would be Sunday, 22 March 750.

References

Bibliography
 
 
 
 
 
 

Bagan